Impletosphaeridium elegans is an extinct species of dinoflagellates in the order Gonyaulacales. It is from the Early Tertiary.

References

External links 
 Impletosphaeridium elegans at dinoflaj

Gonyaulacales
Protists described in 1998
Dinoflagellate species
Fossil taxa described in 1998
Paleogene life